The Louts (Spanish:Los gamberros) is a 1954 Spanish comedy film directed by Juan Lladó.

Cast
 Barta Barri 
 Modesto Cid 
 Jesús Colomer 
 Carmen de Colomer 
 Miguel Gila 
 Adela González 
 Milagros Leal 
 José Marco 
 Mariam 
 Diana Mayer 
 Marion Mitchell 
 César Ojinaga 
 María Cristina Palau 
 Eugenia Roca 
 Rafael Romero Marchent 
 José Sazatornil
 Aurora Tarrida
 Julián Ugarte 
 Miguel Ángel Valdivieso
 Fernando Vallejo

References

Bibliography 
 Bentley, Bernard. A Companion to Spanish Cinema. Boydell & Brewer 2008.

External links 
 

1954 comedy films
Spanish comedy films
1954 films
1950s Spanish-language films
Films directed by Juan Lladó
Films with screenplays by Ignacio F. Iquino
Films produced by Ignacio F. Iquino
Spanish black-and-white films
1950s Spanish films